Riceford may refer to:

Riceford, Minnesota, an unincorporated community
Riceford Creek, a stream in Minnesota